Gilbert Granville Sharp (19 February 1894 – 1 November 1968), was a British Liberal Party politician and barrister.

Background
He was the born in Mafeking, South Africa where his father, Reverend Alfred Spring Sharp of Prestatyn, Flintshire, was a Methodist missionary. His mother, Amelia Adelaide Latham, was the granddaughter of an 1820 Settler from London. Sharp had one brother and two sisters. He was educated at Kingswood School and Fitzwilliam College, Cambridge. BA, LLB Cambs., 1919. He was President of Cambridge Union in 1921 and the Cambridge University Liberal Club from 1920-1921. He married, in 1915, Margaret Featherstone Kellett. They had one daughter. He married, in 1953, Eleanor Christina Brooke (née Herron).

Early career
He was in Military Service, 1914–18, Public Schools Battalion and 2nd Scottish Border Regiment, Lieut, France, 1915–16 (wounded in Battle of Somme); Special Instructor of Signals, 1917.

Legal career
He was Call to Bar, Middle Temple, in 1921. He was President Hardwicke Society, 1924. He was Recorder of King’s Lynn, 1943–57. He was Chief of Legal and Advice Branch, Legal Division (British Section), Austrian Control Commission, 1944–45. He was General Council of the Bar, 1946–48; He was appointed a King's Council in 1948. He was Justice of Appeal of the Supreme Court, Ghana, 1957–62. He was a Commissioner in the Crown Courts, Manchester, 1963–67, and Liverpool, 1965-67.

Political career
He was President of Cambridge University Liberal Club, 1921. He was Liberal candidate for the Epping Division of Essex at the 1922, 1923, 1924, 1929, and 1935 General Elections. Epping was a safe Conservative seat which had never returned a Liberal. Sharp stood as a candidate for the party that was led by H. H. Asquith rather than that led by David Lloyd George.

A now united Liberal Party had a resurgence at the next election and Sharp came his closest to winning Epping;

Former Liberal Winston Churchill was Sharp's opponent at the next election, standing as a Constitutionalist. Although Churchill had not yet re-joined the Unionists, he stood with their local support;

The Liberal Party, now led by Lloyd George, was challenging strongly both nationally and locally, and for the first time in Epping since the war, the Unionist vote dropped below 50%;

Following the formation of the National government, he did not contest a seat at the 1931 General Election. Epping Liberals chose another Liberal candidate who managed to retain second place. He returned to contest Epping at the next election, polling his lowest share of the vote. This was the last time he contested Epping;

He was elected a Member of the Liberal Party Council in 1941. He did not contest a seat at the 1945 General Election. He was appointed to the Royal Commission on the Press, serving from 1947–49. He was Liberal candidate for the newly created Cornwall seat of Falmouth and Camborne at the 1950 General Election. Although Cornwall was a county where the Liberal Party support was strong, in this part of the county, Labour was established as the main alternative to the Conservatives and he finished a distant third;

He was a Governor of Guy's Hospital.

Publications 
Co-edited with Brian Galpin, Maxwell on the Interpretation of Statutes, 10th edition, 1953.

Death 
Sharp died on 1 November 1968 at the age of 74.

See also
 List of judges of the Supreme Court of Ghana
 Supreme Court of Ghana
List of Cambridge Union Society presidents

References

External links
Portrait of Sharp at the National Portrait Gallery: http://www.npg.org.uk/collections/search/person/mp52358/gilbert-granville-sharp?search=sas&sText=Gilbert+Granville+Sharp

1894 births
1968 deaths
Alumni of Fitzwilliam College, Cambridge
Liberal Party (UK) parliamentary candidates
Presidents of the Cambridge Union